Citadel Peak is located on the border of Alberta and British Columbia on the Continental Divide. It was named in 1913 by Arthur O. Wheeler.

See also
List of peaks on the Alberta–British Columbia border
Mountains of Alberta
Mountains of British Columbia

References

Citadel Peak
Citadel Peak
Canadian Rockies